Augustus Maiyo (born May 10, 1983) is a Kenyan-born American long distance runner. An alumnus of the University of Alabama, he is also in the United States Army and competes in marathons as a member of the U.S. Army World Class Athlete Program.

Maiyo won the 2012 Marine Corps Marathon. At the 2012 IAAF World Half Marathon Championships Maiyo finished 15th.

References

External links 

 
 

1983 births
Living people
American male long-distance runners
Kenyan male long-distance runners
Place of birth missing (living people)
American male marathon runners
American people of Kenyan descent
American sportspeople of African descent
Sportspeople of Kenyan descent
United States Army soldiers
University of Alabama alumni
Athletes (track and field) at the 2019 Pan American Games
Pan American Games track and field athletes for the United States
U.S. Army World Class Athlete Program